In military terms, 25th Division may refer to:

Infantry divisions 
 25th Division (German Empire)
 25th Panzergrenadier Division (Wehrmacht)
 25th Waffen Grenadier Division of the SS Hunyadi (1st Hungarian)
 25th Infantry Division (India)
 25th Infantry Division Bologna, Kingdom of Italy
 25th Division (Imperial Japanese Army)
 25th Infantry Division (Ottoman Empire)
 25th Infantry Division (Poland)
 25th Rifle Division (Soviet Union)
 25th Guards Rifle Division, Soviet Union
 25th Infantry Division (South Korea)
 25th Division (South Vietnam)
 25th Division (Spain)
 25th Division (United Kingdom)
 25th Infantry Division (United States)

Airborne divisions 
 25th Parachute Division (France)

Armoured divisions 
 25th Panzer Division (Wehrmacht)
 25th Tank Division (Soviet Union), see order of battle for Operation Barbarossa

See also 
 List of military divisions by number
 25th Brigade (disambiguation)